Berat Kalkan (born 2 March 2003) is a professional footballer who plays as a winger for Kasımpaşa in the Süper Lig. Born in Turkey, he is a youth international for North Macedonia.

Professional career
Kalkan made his professional debut with Kasımpaşa in a 2-0 Süper Lig win over Gençlerbirliği S.K. on 29 November 2020.

International career
Born in Turkey, Kalkan is of Macedonian descent. He has represented the North Macedonia U18, and U19s.

References

External links
 
 
 Mackolik Profile

2003 births
Living people
People from Gaziosmanpaşa
Macedonian footballers
North Macedonia youth international footballers
Turkish footballers
Turkish people of Macedonian descent
Kasımpaşa S.K. footballers
Süper Lig players
Association football wingers